Community High School District 155 is a local school district serving areas of McHenry County, Illinois.

The current Superintendent of this district is Steve Olson. Community High School District 155 includes the communities of Bull Valley, Burtons Bridge, Cary, Crystal Lake, Fox River Grove, Lake in the Hills, Lakewood, Oakwood Hills, Prairie Grove, and Ridgefield, and the district is approximately 45 miles northwest of downtown Chicago. Enrollment is 5,673 students, as of 2022.

History

Community High School District 155 was established on December 6, 1919, by an election.

Schools
There are four comprehensive high schools as well as one alternative education center, grades 9–12. The five schools are:
Crystal Lake Central High School, established 1924
Crystal Lake South High School, established 1978
Cary-Grove High School, established 1961
Prairie Ridge High School, established 1997
Haber Oaks, alternative education center, established 2008

References

External links
Community High School District 155

School districts in McHenry County, Illinois
Crystal Lake, Illinois
1919 establishments in Illinois
School districts established in 1919